In the area of abstract algebra known as group theory, the diameter of a finite group is a measure of its complexity.

Consider a finite group , and any set of generators . Define  to be the graph diameter of the Cayley graph .

For instance, every finite cyclic group of order , the Cayley graph for a generating set with one generator is an -vertex cycle graph.

It is conjectured, for all non-abelian finite simple groups , that

Many partial results are known but the full conjecture remains open.

References

Finite groups
Measures of complexity